Western New York Wine Company, also known as the Philip Argus House and Winery, is a historic winery located at Pulteney, Steuben County, New York. The main building consists of a home and winery building built in 1886 and 1890, respectively. The buildings were connected in the 1970s. It is a two-story, "L"-shaped, fieldstone dwelling with an attached three-story, fieldstone winery. Both elements have cross-gable roofs.  Also on the property is a contributing English barn built about 1880.  The winery remains in operation as Chateau Frank.

It was listed on the National Register of Historic Places in 2014.

References

External links
Chateau Frank website

Wineries in New York (state)
Industrial buildings and structures on the National Register of Historic Places in New York (state)
Industrial buildings completed in 1890
Buildings and structures in Steuben County, New York
National Register of Historic Places in Steuben County, New York